Jane Eyre is a 1997 British television film that first broadcast on ITV and stars Samantha Morton in the title role. It is an adaptation of Charlotte Brontë's 1847 novel of the same name.

This version of the story is noted for omitting the middle scenes with Mrs Reed, the Rivers' relationship to Jane, and her paternal uncle's inheritance from his estate in Madeira. It was originally shown on ITV on 9 March 1997 in the UK and shown on A&E-TV on 19 October 1997 in the US. It is sometimes repeated on ITV3.

Cast
Samantha Morton as Jane Eyre
Ciarán Hinds as Edward Fairfax Rochester
Laura Harling as Young Jane
Rupert Penry-Jones as St. John Rivers
Gemma Jones as Mrs. Alice Fairfax
Timia Berthome as Adele
David Gant as Mr. Brocklehurst
Abigail Cruttenden as Blanche Ingram
Ben Sowden as John Reed
Deborah Findlay as Mrs.Reed
Kay Mellor as Mrs. Butterworth

References

External links

 

Rotten Tomatoes reviews
Review at JaneEyre.net
An Enthusiast's Guide to Jane Eyre Adaptations

Television shows based on British novels
1997 films
1997 romantic drama films
British romantic drama films
Films based on Jane Eyre
Films about nannies
Films directed by Robert Young
Films scored by Richard Harvey
London Weekend Television shows
1990s English-language films
1990s British films